Luise Wilhelmine Elisabeth Abegg (3 March 1882 – 8 August 1974) was a German educator and resistance fighter against Nazism. She provided shelter to around 80 Jews during the Holocaust and was consequently recognised as Righteous Among the Nations.

Biography

Abegg was born in 1882 in Strasbourg, then a part of Germany, to Johann Friedrich Abegg, a jurist, and Marie Caroline Elisabeth (Rähm) Abegg. In 1912, she enrolled at Leipzig University, where she studied history, classical philology and Romance studies, and graduated with a doctorate in 1916. She moved to Berlin in 1918 when the Alsace region was reclaimed by France. In Berlin, she became involved in postwar relief work organised by the Quaker community.

Abegg openly criticised the Nazi regime after Adolf Hitler assumed power in 1933. She was transferred to another school as punishment for her criticism and was questioned by the Gestapo in 1938. In 1941, she was forced to retire from teaching and officially converted to Quakerism in 1941. She began to help persecuted Jews find safe shelter in 1942. She established an extensive network of rescuers—including her Quaker friends and her former students—to provide accommodation to Jews in hiding. Abegg temporarily housed dozens of Jews in her Tempelhof apartment, which she shared with her mother and disabled sister, and vacant neighbouring apartments, and secured permanent accommodation for them across Berlin, East Prussia and Alsace. She sold her jewelry to pay for some Jews' escape to Switzerland and tutored hiding Jewish children at her apartment. In total, she sheltered around 80 Jews between 1942 and 1945.

After the Second World War, Abegg resumed teaching in Berlin. She became a member of the Social Democratic Party of Germany and was active in Quaker groups. In 1957, a group of Jews whom Abegg had rescued during the Holocaust published a book, titled And a Light Shined in the Darkness, in dedication to her. She died in Berlin on 8 August, 1974.

Honours and legacy
Abegg received the Order of Merit of the Federal Republic of Germany (Verdienstkreuz am Bande) in 1957. In 1967, she was recognised as Righteous Among the Nations by Yad Vashem. A memorial plaque was mounted in her Tempelhof neighbourhood in 1991 and a street in Berlin's Mitte, Elisabeth-Abegg-Straße, was named after her in 2006.

References

Sources
Bernet, Claus (2006). Elisabeth Abegg. In: Biographisch-Bibliographisches Kirchenlexikon (BBKL). Vol. 26, Nordhausen: Bautz, Sp. 1–3
Bender, Sara; Borut, Jakob; Fraenkel, Daniel; Gutman, Israel; eds. (2005). Lexikon der Gerechten unter den Völkern. Deutsche und Österreicher. Yad Vashem und Wallstein-Verlag, Göttingen, 
Pereles, Liselotte (1984). Die Retterin in der Not. In: Kurt R. Grossmann: Die unbesungenen Helden. Menschen in Deutschlands dunklen Tagen. Berlin / Wien:Ullstein Verlag, pp. 85–93.

1882 births
1974 deaths
German Righteous Among the Nations
Female resistance members of World War II
German schoolteachers
German Quakers
20th-century Quakers
People from Strasbourg
People from Berlin
Leipzig University alumni
20th-century German educators
Recipients of the Cross of the Order of Merit of the Federal Republic of Germany